Julia Chanourdie (born 25 June 1996) is a French professional rock climber. She is mainly active in lead climbing competitions. She also climbs outdoors, and on November 7, 2020, she became the second-ever female in history to climb a  route, Eagle–4 in Saint-Léger-du-Ventoux, France. Chanourdie won the bronze medal at The World Games 2017 in Wrocław, Poland.

Notable ascents

Redpoint

Eagle–4, Saint-Léger-du-Ventoux, 7 November 2020, second-ever female in history to climb 9b (after Angela Eiter)

Super Crackinette, Saint-Léger-du-Ventoux, 13 March 2020

Ground Zero, Tetto di Sarre, 25 March 2017
Molasse’son, Mollans, 5 April 2018

Rankings

Climbing World Cup

Climbing World Championships 
Youth

Adult

Climbing European Championships 
Youth

Adult

Rock Masters

Number of medals in the Climbing World Cup

Lead

See also 
History of rock climbing
List of first ascents (sport climbing)

References

External links 

 
 
 
 
 

Female climbers
French rock climbers
Living people
1996 births
Université Savoie-Mont Blanc alumni
World Games bronze medalists
Competitors at the 2017 World Games
Sport climbers at the 2020 Summer Olympics
Olympic sport climbers of France
20th-century French women
21st-century French women